The Swedish–American Historical Society was founded in 1949 to record "the achievements of the Swedish pioneers" in North America. It has published numerous books since then and also publishes a scholarly journal titled the Swedish–American Historical Quarterly, formerly the  Swedish Pioneer Historical Quarterly.

See also
 Swedish Americans

References

External links 

Organizations established in 1949
Swedish migration to North America
Historical societies
Organizations based in Chicago